The South River is a  tributary of the Great Egg Harbor River in Atlantic County, New Jersey, in the United States.

A short outlet has been cut from the South River to the Great Egg Harbor River across from Catawba, allowing water traffic to bypass the lower part of the river paralleling the Great Egg Harbor.

See also
List of rivers of New Jersey

References

External links
 Estell Manor Park

Rivers of Atlantic County, New Jersey
Rivers of New Jersey
Tributaries of the Great Egg Harbor River
Wild and Scenic Rivers of the United States